The Vanity Serum is a 2004 Italian giallo film directed by Alex Infascelli. It is loosely based on the novel Il libro italiano dei morti by Niccolò Ammaniti.

Plot synopsis
The VIPs of Italian television mysteriously disappear. Two detectives, Lucia and Franco, try to investigate the mystery, drowning into a strange world ruled by the powerful movie star Sonia Norton.

Cast  
Margherita Buy as Lucia Allasco
Francesca Neri as  Sonia Norton 
Valerio Mastandrea as  Franco Berardi
Barbora Bobuľová as  Azzurra Rispoli
Marco Giallini as  Michele Benda
Ninni Bruschetta as  Vittorio Terracciano
 Luis Molteni as  Rocco Piccolo
 Rosario J. Gnolo  as  Mago Daniel
 Armando De Razza as  Michel Simone

See also  
 List of Italian films of 2004

References

External links

2004 films
Giallo films
Films directed by Alex Infascelli
2000s mystery films
1990s Italian films